Senda de gloria (English title: Path to Glory) is a Mexican telenovela produced by Ernesto Alonso for Televisa in 1987. The telenovela recreates historical events in Mexico between 1916 and 1939. It starred Eduardo Yáñez, Julieta Rosen, Ignacio López Tarso, Blanca Sánchez, Roxana Chávez and Anabel Ferreira.

Plot 
The story begins in 1916, with the Mexican Revolution seemingly coming to an end. General Eduardo Álvarez and his family are waiting for the train at the station and there they meet Manuel Fortuna, a young railroad employee who will come to have a significant role in their lives. Miguel falls in love with Andrea, the eldest daughter of the general, but a great gulf separates them.  Additionally, Miguel lives with Mercedes, a woman who adores him and therefore does not want to hurt her.

Cast 

 Eduardo Yáñez as Manuel Fortuna
 Julieta Rosen as Andrea Álvarez
 Ignacio López Tarso as General Eduardo Álvarez
 Blanca Sánchez as Fernanda Álvarez
 Roxana Chávez as Julieta Álvarez
 Anabel Ferreira as Nora Álvarez
 Roberto Vander as James Van Hallen
 José Alonso as Héctor Álvarez
 Raúl Araiza as Father Antonio Álvarez
 Abel Salazar as General Rosario Talamantes
 Rosita Arenas as Mercedes
 Delia Magaña as Nana Nacha
 Arturo Vázquez as Abundio
 Ramón Menéndez as Venustiano Carranza
 Manuel Ojeda as Emiliano Zapata
 Guillermo Gil as Pancho Villa
 Salvador Sánchez as Adolfo de la Huerta
 Manuel López Ochoa as Plutarco Elías Calles
 Aarón Hernán as Pascual Ortiz Rubio
 Bruno Rey as Álvaro Obregón
 Rodrigo de la Mora as Emilio Portes Gil
 Julio Monterde as Abelardo L. Rodríguez
 Héctor Sáez as José Vasconcelos
 Arturo Beristáin as Lázaro Cárdenas
 Ángel Aragón as Felipe Ángeles
 Antonio Medellín as Luis N. Morones
 Norma Lazareno as Angelina Beloff
 Miguel Palmer as Tomás Garrido Canabal
 Alejandro Ruiz as José León Toral
 Jorge Fegán as Luis Cabrera
 Rodolfo Solís as Jesús Guajardo
 César Castro as Miguel Alessio Robles
 Alfredo Gutiérrez as Pablo González
 Jorge Victoria as Ing. Ignacio Bonillas
 Raúl Valerio as Manuel Aguirre Berlanga
 Sergio Zuani as Don Félix Díaz
 Marco Muñoz as Renato Álvarez
 Alberto Gavira as Don Lupe
 Javier Ruán as Fermín del Río
 Roberto D'Amico as General Francisco R. Serrano
 Ricardo de Pascual as Julio Torri
 Juan José Gurrola as Diego Rivera
 Eduardo Alcaraz as Obispo Mora y del Río
 Ricardo Kleinbaum as Obispo Pascual Díaz
 Héctor Flores as Father Miguel Agustín Pro
 Gilberto Román as Víctor Iriarte
 Jorge Reynoso as Coronel Cristero
 Carlos González as Claudio Fox
 Armando Araiza as Gilberto
 Claudio Brook
 Eric del Castillo

Awards

References

External links 

1987 telenovelas
Mexican telenovelas
Televisa telenovelas
1987 Mexican television series debuts
1987 Mexican television series endings
Spanish-language telenovelas
Television shows set in Mexico City